Carex lonchocarpa, the southern long sedge, is a species of flowering plant in the family Cyperaceae, native to Texas and the southeastern US. A perennial reaching , it can be found in a wide variety of wet habitats, on sand, peat, or acid soils.

References

lonchocarpa
Endemic flora of the United States
Flora of Texas
Flora of the Southeastern United States
Plants described in 1826